Retera is a surname. Notable people with the surname include:

Mark Retera (born 1964), Dutch cartoonist
Dennis Retera (born 1986), Dutch racing driver